Monteverde may refer to:

Places
Chile
 Monte Verde, an archaeological site

Costa Rica
 Monteverde, a small town in the Province of Puntarenas known for the Monteverde Cloud Forest Reserve
Monteverde Cloud Forest Reserve
Serpentario de Monteverde
Monteverde Theme Park

Italy
 Monteverde, Campania, a comune in the Province of Avellino
 Monteverde, Lazio, a district in the City of Rome

Popular media
Monteverde, an island in the 2020 film, Dolittle

People
 Juan Domingo de Monteverde (1773-1832), Capitan General of Venezuela from 1812 to 1813
 Giulio Monteverde (1837–1917), an Italian naturalist and sculptor
 Lily Monteverde (b. 1928), a Filipino film producer
 Lucas Monteverde, an international Polo player

See also
 Monteverdi (disambiguation)